Hong Da-jung (born 3 February 1986) is a South Korean former professional tennis player.

Born in Seoul, Hong was considered a tennis prodigy in South Korea and won the All Korea Junior Championships as a 14-year old. She received training in the United States and reached a best ITF junior world ranking of 26.

Hong, who is short in stature, played for the South Korea Fed Cup team in 2003, winning all three of her singles rubbers.

ITF finals

Singles: 2 (1–1)

Doubles: 1 (1–0)

References

External links
 
 
 

1986 births
Living people
South Korean female tennis players
Tennis players from Seoul